This article contains a list of pigs in various categories of fiction, including pigs and warthogs.

Advertising mascots and Animatronics
 Madame Oink, an early guest star at Chuck E. Cheese's Pizza Time Theatre. She spoke in a thick French accent and often sang traditional French songs. She appeared in several earlier show tapes from the late 1970s and early 1980s.
 Moo and Oink, a grocery store chain.
 Percy Pig, sugary treat that can be purchased from Marks & Spencer.
 Piggly Wiggly, supermarket chain which features a pig as its mascot.
 Pig 'n Whistle restaurants.
 Stella, intelligent and sociable pig in a vegan children book: "The Pig Who Made It Big"

In literature

Comics

Nursery rhymes and fairy tales
The pigs in "Birds of a feather" nursery rhyme
The Three Little Pigs
The market-going little pig and his brethren in the counting rhyme, used to name toes, who variously had roast beef or didn't, etc.
The fat pig, the buying of which was the reason for going to market in the nursery rhyme
A pig who eats up the pancake in the fairy tale "The Runaway Pancake"

Folklore and mythology
Beast of Dean, an abnormally large wild boar said to live, or have lived, in the Forest of Dean, England
Calydonian Boar, another boar which features strongly in Greek mythology
Erymanthian Boar, a boar that was to be captured as one of the Twelve Labours of Hercules
Gullinbursti, a boar in Norse mythology
The men transformed into pigs by Circe in the story of Homer's Odyssey
Pigs, of Chinese zodiac year
Twrch Trwyth, of Welsh mythology, features prominently in the tale of Culhwch and Olwen

In media

Animation

Film

Music

Radio
The Archers, BBC Radio 4's soap opera features Eddie Grundy's pig Barbarella, named after a film

Television

Video games

Other

In toys
Monokuro Boo, a pair of monochrome pigs developed by the Japanese company San-X.
Pass the Pigs, variation of a dice game, using two small plastic pigs
Pippo, a Sanrio character created in 1993
Razor Beast, a primal which takes the form of a warthog, from the Transformers line Beast Wars
Squealer Knuckle "Beanie Babies"
Truffles from the Me to You Bears range

See also
Pigs in culture
List of individual pigs

References

Pigs
 
Fictional